Anhonee is a 1952 Indian Hindi-language psychological drama film directed by K. A. Abbas. The film stars Nargis in a double role alongside Raj Kapoor in the lead, supported by Om Prakash, Agha, David, Achla Sachdev in other prominent roles. The film had music composed by Roshan, while the lyrics were written by Ali Sardar Jafri. Nargis was highly appreciated for enacting a dual role and her performance garnered critical acclaim. Abbas attempted to explore two concepts – Geneticsm and Determinism, a theme which he experimented in Aawara (1951).

Plot 

The film deals with the story of two sisters – Mohini and Roop – both played by Nargis – one legitimate, raised by a courtesan, and one illegitimate. As time passes by, Roop falls in love with Rajkumar Saxena, an advocate – who is a tenant – comes to pay the house rent to her father, but instead meets Roop. Soon they become involved in a romantic relationship, and Roop convinces her father for their marriage.

As the family plan to organise a party to formally announce the wedding, Rajkumar runs into Mohini, Roop's twin sister, and learns that Mohini is the real daughter. Unable to bear this, Mohini gets into an unpleasant situation, and becomes angry over Rajkumar. In the meanwhile, Roop learns the truth, and tries to save Mohini by deciding to swap the positions of both of them. During this, the marriage happens where Rajkumar unknowingly weds Mohini. When Roop's father becomes aware of this, he dies.

Cast 
 Raj Kapoor as Advocate Raj Kumar Saxena
 Nargis as Roop Singh / Mohini Bai (Double Role)
 Om Prakash as Shyam Sundar Laddan
 Agha as Vidyasagar
 David as Munshiji
 Achla Sachdev as Champa
 Badri Prasad as Thakur Harnam Singh
 Salma	as Salma Mirza
 Shaukat Hashmi
 Moti Bina
 Habib Alkaf

Music

Soundtrack

Production 
K. A. Abbas, the director, had been associated with a close friend of his during the making of Dharti Ke Lal, the former's directorial debut. Abbas, along with another friend Gulshan, eventually planned to make a film. they went on to make Awaara, which became an instant hit. After the success of the film, Abbas was approached and he decided to direct a film under his own production. It was reported that Nargis had made a contact to Abbas requesting him to provide a more significant role for her. So he applied the same theme, interchanging the lead roles, and produced the story, guided by his friend V. P. Sathe and Mohsin Abdullah who co-wrote the script. They launched a new banner named "Naya Sansar", and produced the film with Nargis and Raj Kapoor in lead roles. This also marked the first occasion where an actor was cast in a dual role in a Hindi film.

References

External links 

1952 films
1950s Hindi-language films
1950s psychological drama films
Indian psychological drama films
Films directed by K. A. Abbas
Films scored by Roshan
Films with screenplays by Khwaja Ahmad Abbas
1952 drama films
Indian black-and-white films